Kerry Dale Johnson (born 23 October 1963) is a retired Australian athlete who competed in the sprints. She represented her country at the 1988 and 1992 Summer Olympics. In addition, she won one gold and two silver medals at the 1990 Commonwealth Games.

She has personal bests of 11.19	seconds in the 100 metres (+1.6 m/s, Auckland 1990) and 22.82 seconds in the 200 metres (+1.7 m/s, Chiba 1988).

International competitions

1Representing Oceania

References

1963 births
Living people
Australian female sprinters
Athletes (track and field) at the 1986 Commonwealth Games
Athletes (track and field) at the 1988 Summer Olympics
Athletes (track and field) at the 1990 Commonwealth Games
Athletes (track and field) at the 1992 Summer Olympics
Olympic athletes of Australia
Commonwealth Games medallists in athletics
Commonwealth Games gold medallists for Australia
Commonwealth Games silver medallists for Australia
Olympic female sprinters
20th-century Australian women
21st-century Australian women
Medallists at the 1990 Commonwealth Games